Peter Martin Christian (born 16 October 1947) is a Micronesian politician who served as the 8th President of the Federated States of Micronesia, from 11 May 2015 to 11 May 2019. 

Peter Martin Christian was among the first fourteen persons to be elected to the first Congress in 1979. He served as the Speaker of the Congress of the Federated States of Micronesia from May 2003 to May 2007. He was elected as a senator in 2007 representing Pohnpei at-large and re-elected in 2011.  He served as the Chairman of the Committee on Transportation and Communication during his 2007 term in Congress.

In March 2019, Christian lost the election to become the at-large senator for Pohnpei. Under Micronesian law, the president is chosen from among the four at-large members. As a result, Christian effectively lost his bid for re-election to the presidency. Some sources attributed the loss to a scandal surrounding the indictment in Hawaii of Christian's son-in-law, Master Halbert, an official in the FSM's Department of Transportation, Communication and Infrastructure, for receiving bribes.

Christian has Moluccan blood ties. He is the third generation of a family from Haria, Maluku in Indonesia.

See also

Politics of Micronesia
Congress of Micronesia

References

External links

Office of the President of the Federated States of Micronesia
Marianas Variety – FSM has new president, vice president, speaker

1947 births
Living people
Speakers of the Congress of the Federated States of Micronesia
People from Pohnpei State
Presidents of the Federated States of Micronesia
Moluccan people
University of Guam alumni
Federated States of Micronesia people of Indonesian descent
21st-century politicians